Sergei Vyacheslavovich Dymov (born 11 July 1975) is a former Russian professional football player.

Club career
He made his Russian Football National League debut for FC Fakel Voronezh on 22 April 1993 in a game against FC Torpedo Taganrog. He played 3 seasons in the FNL for Fakel, FC SKA Rostov-on-Don and FC Gazovik Orenburg.

External links
 

1975 births
People from Tatsinsky District
Living people
Russian footballers
Association football defenders
FC Fakel Voronezh players
FC APK Morozovsk players
FC SKA Rostov-on-Don players
FC Lokomotiv Nizhny Novgorod players
FC Orenburg players
Sportspeople from Rostov Oblast